Quantum Psychology: How Brain Software Programs You & Your World is a book written by science-fiction writer Robert Anton Wilson, originally published in 1990. It deals with what Wilson himself calls "quantum psychology," which is not a field within academic psychology.

Some consider Quantum Psychology a follow-up to Wilson's earlier volume Prometheus Rising, mainly for the presence of practical exercises to demonstrate its concepts at the end of each chapter (this time intended for groups rather than a lone reader). It focuses primarily on the metaphysical and epistemological problems of Aristotelean reasoning and its use in everyday language, covering E-Prime (Wilson wrote the book in E-Prime) and how it addresses many of the semantic (and resulting perceptual) "spooks" that common language lets in.

It also covers psychosomatic healing and a possible explanation for it; non-local effects in quantum physics (Bell's theorem) and the theories of David Bohm; and a brief recap of the Timothy Leary eightfold consciousness theory of human consciousness which Prometheus Rising covers in greater detail.

References

External links
Excerpt from Quantum Psychology

1990 non-fiction books
General semantics
Consciousness studies
Books by Robert Anton Wilson
Quantum mind